The Podium West Tower is an 48-storey office skyscraper in Mandaluyong, Metro Manila, Philippines. It is part of The Podium mixed-used development, a project which was started in 2002. At its base, occupying the first five levels of the building, is The Podium shopping mall.

The Podium shopping mall opened in 2002 but construction of The Podium West Tower would begin years later in 2015. The building topped-out on September 27, 2018 and overall construction of the tower was finished in May 2019.

Prior to its completion, the US Green Building Council has given the building LEED Gold Mark certification. The Building and Construction Authority of Singapore also gave the building provisional Green Mark Gold Award.

References

Skyscrapers in Metro Manila
Office buildings completed in 2019
Buildings and structures in Mandaluyong
Arquitectonica buildings
21st-century architecture in the Philippines